Helle Meri (born 14 March 1949), widow of Lennart Meri, is an Estonian actress who also served as the First Lady of Estonia from 1992 to 2001.

Helle Meri (née Pihlak) was born in the small town of Rapla where she also went to school. In her spare time she actively participated in different sports and played basketball.

After secondary school, she went on to study at the Stage School of Tallinn Conservatory. Before serving as the First Lady, she played in the Estonian Drama Theatre from 1972 up until 1992 when Lennart Meri became the Estonian Ambassador to Finland prior to his nine years of presidency. The couple got married in 1992 when her acting career came to an end.

In theatre, Helle Pihlak had roles in numerous classical pieces to a good critical acclaim, including the pieces by Estonian playwrights like August Kitzberg, A. H. Tammsaare, Jaan Kross and Jaan Kruusvall among many. She had roles also in musicals, in children's plays and in film.

Prior to her marriage with Lennart Meri, Helle Pihlak was in a relationship with actor Jaak Tamleht and a long-term relationship with composer Eino Tamberg. Helle Meri has one daughter, Tuule Meri (born in 1985).

Helle Meri is the patron of the Estonian SOS Children's Village in Keila.

References 

 

1949 births
20th-century Estonian actresses
Estonian Academy of Music and Theatre alumni
Estonian film actresses
Estonian stage actresses
Living people
People from Rapla
Spouses of presidents of Estonia